Pseudophallus is a genus of freshwater pipefishes native to Central and South America.

Species
There are currently three recognized species in this genus:
 Pseudophallus elcapitanensis (Meek & Hildebrand, 1914)
 Pseudophallus mindii (Meek & Hildebrand, 1923)
 Pseudophallus starksii (D. S. Jordan & Culver, 1895)

References

Syngnathidae
Freshwater fish genera